The 2003–04 season was the 104th season in Società Sportiva Lazio's history and their 16th consecutive season in the top-flight of Italian football. Despite financial problems, Lazio attained a respectable 6th place in Serie A and won the Coppa Italia, defeating Juventus in the two-legged final.

Squad

Transfers

Left club during season

,  €4,000,000

Competitions

Serie A

Results summary

Results by round

Matches

Coppa Italia

Round of 32
''bye due to SS Lazio was classified to UEFA Champions League

Eightfinals

Quarterfinals

Semifinals

Finals

Top scorers
  Bernardo Corradi 10
  César 6
  Simone Inzaghi 6
  Stefano Fiore 6
  Claudio López 4 (1)

UEFA Champions League

Third qualifying round

Group stage

Group G

Statistics

Players statistics

References

S.S. Lazio seasons
Lazio